Oplopanax is a small genus of flowering plants in the family Araliaceae, consisting of three species of deciduous shrubs, native to western North America and northeastern Asia. Oplopanax is closely related to the Asian genus Fatsia. There are three recognized species of Oplopanax in the world: Oplopanax elatus, Oplopanax horridus, Oplopanax japonicus.

The species have spiny stems, large palmately lobed leaves, and whitish or greenish flowers occurring in terminal panicles. The fruit is a small spherical red drupe, popular with birds.

Oplopanax species are closely related to American ginseng. The plant was used in traditional Native American medicine.

References

Araliaceae
Apiales genera